Pinny's House is a 1986 animated television series produced by Smallfilms, produced by Oliver Postgate. The show is based on a series of books written and illustrated by Peter Firmin and focuses on the toys in a Victorian dolls' house. The programme premiered on 22 October 1986 as part of the BBC's See-Saw programming block.

The series was the last production by duo Peter Firmin and Oliver Postgate.

Broadcast 
Although the thirteen part series was originally broadcast between October and December 1986, it received many repeats over the years, although often a repeat run would be of just eleven of the thirteen episodes. 
 1st Screening: 22 Oct-12 Dec 1986
 2nd Screening: 9 Apr-25 Jun 1987
 3rd Screening: 17 Nov-4 Dec 1987
 4th Screening: 13 Jan-30 Mar 1988
 5th Screening: 18 Jul-3 Oct 1988
 6th Screening: 17 Feb-21 Apr 1989
 7th Screening: 29 Jun-14 Sep 1989
 8th Screening: 27 May-12 Jun 1991
 9th Screening: 25 Nov-11 Dec 1991
 10th Screening: 12-27 Mar 1992
 11th Screening: 2-18 Nov 1992
 12th Screening: 26 Apr-13 May 1993

Plot 
The series follows the adventures of Pinny, a small wooden doll that lives in a dollhouse on a shelf. A model ship sits next to the house which contains Pinny's sailor friend Victor. The 'adventures' come in the form of the home's two children, Jo and Tom, who often take the toys down to play with them.

Episodes 

 A House for Pinny (22 October 1986)
 Pinny and the Bird (29 October 1986)
 Pinny and the Shipwreck (5 November 1986)
 Pinny and the Truck (12 November 1986)
 Pinny and the Honey Bees (19 November 1986)
 Pinny's Party (26 November 1986)
 Pinny and the Floppy Frog (3 December 1986)
 Pinny in the Salad (8 December 1986)
 Pinny in the Snow (9 December 1986)
 Pinny and the Tortoise (10 December 1986)
 Pinny and the Paper Glider (10 December 1986)
 Pinny By the Sea (11 December 1986)
 Pinny and the Holly Tree (12 December 1986)

References

External links 
 Pinny's House at IMDB
 Pinny's House at Toonhound
 Pinny's House at British Film Institute

1986 British television series debuts
1986 British television series endings
1980s British animated television series
1980s British children's television series
British children's animated drama television series
BBC children's television shows
English-language television shows
Television series by Smallfilms